Eterna is a browser-based "game with a purpose", developed by scientists at Carnegie Mellon University and Stanford University, that engages users to solve puzzles related to the folding of RNA molecules. The project is supported by the Bill and Melinda Gates Foundation, Stanford University, and the National Institutes of Health. Prior funders include the National Science Foundation.

Similar to Foldit—created by some of the same researchers that developed Eterna—the puzzles take advantage of human problem-solving capabilities to solve puzzles that are computationally laborious for current computer models. The researchers hope to capitalize on "crowdsourcing" and the collective intelligence of Eterna players to answer fundamental questions about RNA folding mechanics. The top voted designs are synthesized in a Stanford biochemistry lab to evaluate the folding patterns of the RNA molecules to compare directly with the computer predictions, ultimately improving the computer models.

Ultimately, Eterna researchers hope to determine a "complete and repeatable set of rules" to allow the synthesis of RNAs that consistently fold in expected shapes. Eterna project leaders hope that determining these basic principles may facilitate the design of RNA-based nanomachines and switches. Eterna creators have been pleasantly surprised by the solutions of Eterna players, particularly those of non-researchers whose "creativity isn't constrained by what they think a correct answer should look like".

As of 2016, Eterna has about 250,000 registered players.

Gameplay
Players are presented with a given target shape into which an RNA strand must fold. The player can change the sequence by placing any of the four RNA nucleotides (adenine, cytosine, guanosine and uracil) at various positions; this can alter the free energy of the system and dramatically affect the RNA strand's folding dynamics. In Eterna, different restrictions, such as those on the number of certain bases and the number of the three base pair types, as well as locked bases, are sometimes imposed. A molecule is occasionally also included, which binds with the RNA and has critical effects on the free energy of the system. In some more advanced puzzles, players may be presented with two or three different target shapes at the same time; the single sequence the player produces must fold in the respective shapes under different conditions (presence or absence of a binding molecule).

Eterna puzzles are roughly classified into three types: Challenges, Player Puzzles, and Cloud Lab. Challenges are the puzzles prepared by the game-makers to introduce players to the workings of Eterna as well as to provide series of pre-set puzzles for players to attempt. Player puzzles are generated by players, and Cloud Lab is where the active, proposed and archived laboratory projects are presented for players to review, vote or attempt.

New players are guided through an initial puzzle progression which introduces the basic concepts of RNA structure and folding. As players proceed through puzzles of increasing complexity, the different game interface elements are described. After completing the 30 puzzles and earning all five Eterna Essentials badges, players gain access to the Cloud Lab where they can participate in laboratory research. Once players have completed a sufficient number of RNA puzzles, they unlock the chance to generate puzzles for other players.

Biomedical challenges
In 2016, Eterna launched its first biomedical challenge called OpenTB, an initiative to develop a new diagnostic device for tuberculosis. The project uses a gene expression "signature" discovered by Stanford researchers using public data, and aims to create an open source, paper-based diagnostic kit that can be easily deployed in clinics around the world. The development of the open source kit is a collaboration with MIT's Little Devices Lab. Players successfully designed RNAs to detect the gene signature by round 2 of the challenge, and as of February 2018 testing continues with real patient samples.

Following the success of OpenTB, Eterna launched OpenCRISPR in August 2017, which challenges players to design single guide RNAs (sgRNAs) used in CRISPR gene editing. The goal of the project is to create a new class of sgRNAs that can be modulated by another small molecule (such as theophylline), allowing gene editing in the body to be turned on or off as needed. At the conclusion of round 1 in November 2017, players had submitted over 90,000 RNA designs for synthesis, the largest set of submissions to date.

In response to the SARS-CoV-2 epidemic, Eterna joined the OpenVaccine collaboration to develop methods for stabilizing mRNA molecules that could be stored and shipped without the need for deep freezing. Players submitted 6000 designs for probing the stability of small RNA molecules at the nucleotide level, and used the results to design structured nanoluciferases that were tested for degradation in vitro and for protein expression in vivo. The OpenVaccine research resulted in novel methods and principles for designing stabilized mRNA therapeutics, including vaccines with potentially three times the current shelf life.

Synthetic biology 
In 2019, Eterna launched the ribosome engineering project OpenRibosome in collaboration with the Jewett Lab at Northwestern University to enhance the folding of modified Escherichia coli ribosomes on the iSAT cell-free ribosome construction platform. The protein production of twenty 16S and twenty 23S sequences designed by players are being evaluated in a series of four feedback-based iterations. The ribosomes are being reengineered as molecular machines capable of synthesizing unique polymers.

Accomplishments
 By August 2011, approximately 26,000 players had contributed RNA sequence designs and over 306 designs have been synthesized for in vitro testing.
 In January 2014, the results from Eterna have been published in the PNAS journal, with "Eterna participants" listed as co-authors in the paper.
 The Eterna gamers beat the supercomputer-powered algorithms in solving all the 100 RNA secondary structure design challenges, while the best score of the six algorithms used is 54.  By manipulating the chemical sequences of RNA the gamers created stable forms of desired shapes. The strategies designed by the players identified specific structural features that make inverse RNA folding difficult. The Eterna researchers hope that by integrating their strategies into algorithms, improvement in automated RNA secondary structure design can be achieved. The results of the challenges were published in the Journal of Molecular Biology in February 2016. This was the first paper based on dominant writing contributions—and co-lead authorship—by non-expert citizen scientists recruited through a video game.
 Eterna citizen scientists discovered a discrepancy in SHAPE and DMS chemical probing when reading strings of 7+ adenosine, and subsequently published their findings in Biochemistry. It is the first paper written exclusively by citizen scientists to be published in a peer-reviewed journal.

See also
 Citizen science
 Foldit
 Game with a purpose
 List of crowdsourcing projects
 Serious game

References

External links
 
 Eterna Wiki

Citizen science
2010 video games
Browser games
Human-based computation games
Puzzle video games
RNA
Carnegie Mellon University
Stanford University
Video games developed in the United States